Candelariella aggregata is a species of lichen in the family Candelariaceae. It is found in western North America, Mongolia, and Switzerland where it grows on mosses and plant debris.

Taxonomy
The lichen was formally described as a new species in 2007 by Swedish lichenologist Martin Westberg.

Description
The lichen has an orange to yellow, granular thallus, with the granules (measuring 0.1–0.35 mm) scattered to crowded, and often obscured by the apothecia. The apothecia are lecanorine, and typically measure 0.3–0.6 mm with a flat to convex disc. The ascospores are usually narrowly ellipsoid, although there is some variability in shape; their dimensions are usually in the range 13.0–19.0 by 4.5–6.0 μm. Secondary chemicals found in Candelariella aggregata include calycin, pulvic acid lactone, vulpinic acid, and rhizocarpic acid. The last compound had not previously been reported to occur in genus Candelariella.

Habitat and distribution
Since its original publication, the species has been recorded from Mongolia and Switzerland.

Ecology
Lichenochora arctica is a lichenicolous fungus that has been recorded growing on Candelariella aggregata in Mongolia.

References

aggregata
Lichen species
Lichens described in 2007
Lichens of Mongolia
Lichens of Canada
Lichens of Central Europe
Lichens of the United States
Fungi without expected TNC conservation status